The 2015 African Handball Cup Winners' Cup was the 21st edition, organized by the African Handball Confederation, under the auspices of the International Handball Federation, the handball sport governing body. The tournament was held from May 15–24, 2015 in Libreville, Gabon, contested by 12 teams and won by Espérance de Tunis.

Draw

Preliminary rounds 

Times given below are in WAT UTC+1.

Group A

* Note:  Advance to quarter-finals Relegated to 9-12th classification

Group B

* Note:  Advance to quarter-finals Relegated to 9-12th classification

Knockout stage
Championship bracket

5-8th bracket

9-12th bracket

Final standings

Awards

See also 
 2015 African Handball Champions League

References

External links 
 Tournament profile at goalzz.com
 

African Cup Winner's Cup
African Handball Cup Winners' Cup
African Handball Cup Winners' Cup
2015 in African handball